Swinbrook is a village on the River Windrush, about  east of Burford in Oxfordshire, England. The village is in the civil parish of Swinbrook and Widford. The 2011 Census recorded the parish population as 139.

History
The Church of England parish church of Saint Mary the Virgin dates from about 1200. Its unusual open-sided bell-tower was added in 1822. The church is noted for its 17th-century Fettiplace monuments; that of 1686 was carved by William Bird of Oxford. St Mary's also has a monument to the officers and men of the Royal Navy submarine HMS P514, and especially its commander, Lieutenant W.A. Phillimore, whose parents lived at Swinbrook. In 1942 P514 failed to identify herself to the Royal Canadian Navy minesweeper . The Canadian ship therefore assumed the submarine to be an enemy vessel and rammed P514, sinking her with the loss of all hands.

Four of his six daughters (the "Mitford sisters") are buried in the parish churchyard: Nancy, Unity, and Diana are buried side by side, while Pamela is buried northwest of the tower. There is a tablet in the church commemorating their only brother, Tom, killed in March 1945 in Burma.

Amenities 
Swinbrook Cricket Club has two teams. They play in division 5 and 10 respectively of the Oxfordshire Cricket Association.

References

Sources and further reading

External links

Google 360° panorama of the chancel of St Mary the Virgin parish church, showing the Fettiplace monuments

Cotswolds
Former civil parishes in Oxfordshire
Villages in Oxfordshire
West Oxfordshire District